Frank Twombly Hubbard (May 15, 1920 – February 25, 1976) was an American harpsichord maker, a pioneer in the revival of historical methods of harpsichord building.

Student days
Born in New York, Hubbard studied English literature at Harvard, graduating with AB, 1942 and AM, 1947. One of his friends was William Dowd, who had an interest in early instruments, and together they constructed a clavichord. This connection, with his interest as an amateur violinist in violin making and the location of his library reading stall near the stacks holding books on musical instruments, led to Hubbard's interest in the historic harpsichord.

While pursuing graduate study at Harvard, Hubbard and Dowd both decided to leave to pursue instrument-making. In 1947, Hubbard went to England, and became an apprentice at the workshop of Arnold Dolmetsch in Haslemere. Not learning much about the historic harpsichord, he went to Hugh Gough in London in 1948, with whom he worked for a year. During this time, he was able to visit the collections of early keyboard instruments around Europe and study instruments of historical makers. He studied the viola da gamba with Edgar Hunt at the Trinity College of Music in order to get the subsistence allowance that the G.I. Bill offered, though with his instrument-making, he had no time to practise.

Historical harpsichords
He returned to the USA in 1949 and founded a workshop with Dowd building harpsichords on historical principles, rather than the 20th-century modern (now known as 'revival') style practised by virtually all professional makers, such as Robert Goble. They found work performing restorations of harpsichords in public and private collections which helped them improve their own practises of design and construction. In 1958 the partnership ended and Hubbard formed his own workshop on the Lyman estate in Waltham, Dowd opening a larger workshop in Cambridge.

From 1955–1958, with a Fulbright Fellowship, American Philosophical Society Grant and Belgium American Educational Foundation CRB Fellowship, he was able to examine many more instrumental collections in Europe. From 1967 to 1968, he set up the restoration workshop for the Musée Instrumental at the Paris Conservatoire. In the 1970s, he taught courses at Harvard and Boston University. At the time of the publication of his book, Three Centuries of Harpsichord Making, in 1965, Ralph Kirkpatrick wrote that "he unquestionably knows more about the history and construction of harpsichords than anyone alive today".

He developed a harpsichord in 1963 based on a Pascal Taskin instrument of 1769 which was sold as a do-it-yourself kit. It included a manual and all the crucial parts, with the wooden items planed to the correct thickness but otherwise requiring finishing. In this way any person with a good grasp of woodworking and basic knowledge of harpsichord making, with dedication and careful work, was able to produce a fine instrument. By 1975, approximately 1000 of these instruments had been produced. Some of Hubbard "kit harpsichords" have been (and still are now in the 21st century) used as first-rate instruments in public recitals worldwide.

An amateur violinist, he also restored a number of early violins to their original state and made early (pre-Tourte) bows for instruments of the viol and violin families.
He has been described as "a gentleman of the 18th and 20th centuries, an Anglophile and Francophile who seemed to disapprove of most things German and Italian." He died in 1976 in Wellesley, Massachusetts.

Hubbard's thoughts on the harpsichord
About the revival of authentic instruments for early music:

The ideal harpsichord sound:

Bach and Scarlatti's instruments:

What we still don't know about the history of the harpsichord:

Books
 Frank Hubbard: Three Centuries of Harpsichord Making (Harvard University Press, 1965);  – the authoritative work on the history and construction of the harpsichord when it was published.
 Frank Hubbard: Harpsichord Regulating and Repairing (Tuner's Supply Inc., 1962); ASIN: B0007DXD2C
 Reconstructing the Harpsichord, The Historical Harpsichord: a Monograph Series in Honor of Frank Hubbard, ed. Howard Schott (Pendragon Press, 1983), 1–16

See also
List of historical harpsichord makers

Sources
 Howard Schott: 'Hubbard, Frank (Twombly)', Grove Music Online ed. L. Macy (Accessed June 8, 2007), http://www.grovemusic.com 
 Interview by Hal Haney in Harpsichord, vol.5, no. 1, April 1972.
 Interview by Tom McGeary in The English Harpsichord Magazine, vol.11, no.4, April 1975
 Habit of Perfection – Tribute to Frank Hubbard by Michael Steinberg in the Boston Globe, February 1976

External links
 Hubbard Harpsichords
 About Frank Hubbard

Harpsichord makers
1920 births
1976 deaths
Harvard University alumni
American writers about music
20th-century American non-fiction writers
Writers from New York (state)